Charles Scerri (born 24 April 1964 in Malta) is a former professional footballer and current manager of the Malta Under 17 side, during his career, Scerri played for Floriana, Rabat Ajax, Sliema Wanderers, Hibernians, Hamrun Spartans, Qormi and St. Andrews. Throughout his career Charles played as a midfielder.

International goals

External links
 Charles Scerri at QormiFC.com
 
 Biography-Times Of Malta

Living people
1964 births
Maltese footballers
Malta international footballers
Floriana F.C. players
Rabat Ajax F.C. players
Sliema Wanderers F.C. players
Hibernians F.C. players
Ħamrun Spartans F.C. players
Qormi F.C. players
St. Andrews F.C. players
Association football midfielders